Hicham Ido (born 21 March 1933) is a Lebanese wrestler. He competed in the men's Greco-Roman welterweight at the 1960 Summer Olympics.

References

External links
 

1933 births
Living people
Lebanese male sport wrestlers
Olympic wrestlers of Lebanon
Wrestlers at the 1960 Summer Olympics
Sportspeople from Beirut
20th-century Lebanese people